The South American common toad (Rhinella margaritifera; also mitred toad, in Spanish sapo crestado) is a species complex of toads in the family Bufonidae. They are found throughout the Amazonian South America (Bolivia, Brazil, Colombia, Ecuador, French Guiana, Guyana, Peru, Suriname, and Venezuela) and eastern Panama. It was originally believed to be a single species, but is now known to represent a complex of more than one.

Its natural habitats are primary and secondary lowland, premontane and montane tropical moist forests (including terra firme and seasonally flooded forests). It is a generalist species that can also be found in disturbed areas.

Member species
As of 2013, there were 16 formally described species within this complex, as well as an unknown number that are yet to be recognized.

Rhinella acutirostris
Rhinella alata
Rhinella castaneotica
Rhinella dapsilis
Rhinella hoogmoedi
Rhinella lescurei
Rhinella magnussoni
Rhinella margaritifera
Rhinella paraguayensis
Rhinella martyi
Rhinella ocellata
Rhinella proboscidea
Rhinella roqueana
Rhinella scitula
Rhinella sclerocephala
Rhinella stanlaii

References

margaritifera
Amphibians of Bolivia
Amphibians of Brazil
Amphibians of Colombia
Amphibians of Ecuador
Amphibians of French Guiana
Amphibians of Guyana
Amphibians of Panama
Amphibians of Peru
Amphibians of Suriname
Amphibians of Venezuela
Taxonomy articles created by Polbot
Amphibians described in 1768
Animal species groups
Taxa named by Josephus Nicolaus Laurenti